Walter Lloyd may refer to:
 Walter Lloyd (1580–1661), member of Parliament for Cardiganshire, 1640–1644 
 Walter Lloyd (1678–1747), member of parliament for Cardiganshire, 1734–1742
 Walt Lloyd, a fictional character on the American television series Lost